Free Fire is a battle royale game developed and published by Garena for Android and iOS. It became the most downloaded mobile game globally in 2019. , Free Fire had surpassed 150 million daily active users. Free Fire Max, a graphically enhanced version of Free Fire, was released globally on 28 September 2021.

Gameplay 
In Free Fire, players control a character in a third-person perspective and use a joystick to move. The fire button allows them to shoot and throw items. The character can perform actions such as jumping, crawling, and lying down. During gameplay, players can utilize the "Gloo Wall" grenade as a form of cover to protect against damage.

Game modes 
Free Fire offers over 15 game modes, including Team Deathmatch, Clash Squad, Big Head, Explosive Jump, Cold Steel, Rampage, and Pet Mania. However, modes other than Battle Royale, Clash Squad, and Lone Wolf are only available during special events.

The Battle Royale mode in Free Fire accommodates up to 52 players landing on an island without weapons. They must fight to be the last one standing by scavenging weapons and equipment from buildings. Playing this mode in ranked mode will affect their ranking. There are 6 maps to choose from: Bermuda, Bermuda Remastered, Kalahari, Purgatory, Alpine, and NeXTerra. The mode allows for solo, duo, or squad play.

Clash Squad is a 4-player versus 4-player mode where players purchase weapons and items from an in-game shop during preparation time, then engage in combat against the opposing team. The mode is played in a best-of-7 format, lasting anywhere from 4 to 7 rounds. Each round is won when all players from one team are killed, either by their opponents or through environmental factors. As of 2022, the maps used in Clash Squad are the same as those in Battle Royale mode. The mode can be played as either Ranked or Casual.

Lone Wolf is a variation of the Clash Squad mode that can be played as either a 1-player versus 1-player or 2-player versus 2-player "duo" format with more intricate rules. In each round, both sides have the opportunity to select their equipment for the next 2 rounds. The game is played in a best-of-5 format. If both teams have won 4 rounds each, a final round begins with both sides able to choose any weapon they prefer. All players are automatically equipped with basic items such as a vest and helmet from the start of the round. This mode takes place on its own map known as Iron Dome.
Craftland allows players to design their own maps in Free Fire using an in-game builder tool. The maps created can be shared and played with others. Craftland also supports script editing for advanced customization, giving creators greater freedom to bring their ideas to life. Players can add buildings, gameplay elements, and decorations to the map until they reach the maximum space limit. There are two maps available for players to use as the base for their designs.

Character system 

Free Fire features a character system of 50+ characters. Each character has a unique skill which can be active or passive. Active skills can be triggered manually by an in-game button and passive skills are triggered automatically. Each character can equip 4 skills including the character's skill and 3 skills from other characters (one active skill and three passive skills can be equipped by a single character). Free Fire characters have unique backstories. A few of these characters were inspired by real-life celebrities whom Free Fire had collaborations with, such as Chrono from the collaboration with Cristiano Ronaldo, Dimitri & Thiva from the collaboration with Dimitri Vegas & Like Mike, A-Patroa from the collaboration with Anitta, Alok from the collaboration with DJ Alok and JBeibs from the collaboration with Justin Bieber. In the game, all characters can be acquired for free through the Link system.

Pet System 
In Free Fire, pets can provide support to players during fights. As of 2023, the game features 21 different pets that players can choose to bring into battle. Each pet has a special ability that sets it apart from the others. Some of these abilities are passive and trigger automatically, while others are active and require manual activation. One of the pets in the game, Poring, was added as part of a collaboration with Ragnarok Online. Players can also customize their pets with skins and emotes.

Premise 
Free Fires premise is detailed in animated shorts and other materials published by Garena to promote the game. Free Fire Universe is the universe where the game, comics and stories take place. Each character has a different story and a family background and characters are connected to each other. There are three cities in the universe, called La Luna, Griza, and New Dawn where the characters live. Characters are divided into two factions: the Horizon and the Mambas. The Horizon is the ruling faction of the city where the rich and powerful people are while the Mambas are a liberation group against the Horizon. In 2022 Free Fire released the first short film, "How to Start a Fire", which featured the character Hayato Yagami.

Reception 
The graphics were described as having "a benefit for mid- and low-specification phones", but a reviewer stated that "if games with good graphics are your thing then we don't recommend that you play Free Fire Battlegrounds. But if you like battle royale games and want to have fun with your friends, you should definitely play."

Tais Carvalho of Techtudo commented that Free Fire "prioritizes performance, making it a great choice for any type of device. The gameplay stands out and has enough content to entertain and offer rewarding combat." Regarding the progression of characters and skills, she said it is "a flashy add-on".

In the Google Play annual list of "Best Apps of the Year", Free Fire won in the "Best Popular Vote Game" category of 2019, being the most publicly voted in Brazil and in Thailand.

Garena Free Fire is one of the most popular battle royale mobile games, behind PUBG Mobile, Fortnite Battle Royale and Call of Duty: Mobile. It is particularly popular in Latin America, India and Southeast Asia. Free Fire was the fourth most downloaded game on the Google Play Store in the fourth quarter of 2018, and was the fourth most downloaded game worldwide in 2018 on iOS and the Google Play Store together. The title earned approximately 182 million downloads in 2018, making it the second most downloaded battle royale mobile game (above Fortnite Battle Royale and behind only PUBG Mobile), and grossed approximately $19.3 million in monthly revenues through December 2018, becoming a significant financial success for Garena. As of August 2021, Garena Free Fire has more than one billion downloads on the Google Play Store.

At the end of Q1 2021, Free Fire surpassed PUBG Mobile in revenues in the United States, generating $100 million in turnover as compared to PUBG Mobile's $68 million. Free Fire's revenues jumped by 4.5 times as compared to the same period for the previous year.

By November 2019, Free Fire had grossed over  worldwide.

In 2020 and 2021 Free Fire won the Esports Mobile Game of the Year award at the Esports Awards.

Esports

Free Fire World Series 
Free Fire began the Free Fire World Series (FFWS) esports competition in 2019. In 2020, FFWS was replaced by a series of regional events, the "Free Fire Continental Series" (FFCS), due to the COVID-19 pandemic. In February 2021, Garena announced the Free Fire World Series (FFWS) with a $2 million prize pool.

In 2021, the Free Fire World Series became the most-watched esports event in history with over 5.4 million peak live viewers, surpassing the League of Legends World Championship which had 5.1 million peak viewers.

Regional events 
The "EMEA Invitational" was a replacement for the Free Fire World Series in 2021 for Europe, the Middle East and Africa. This championship featured a total of 12 teams. With a prize pool of USD 200,000.

The Free Fire Asia Championship was a replacement for the Free Fire World Series in 2021 for Asia. This championship featured a total of 31 teams from Vietnam, Indonesia, Thailand, India, Taiwan, Pakistan, and MCP (Malaysia, Cambodia, and Pakistan). The teams compete for a prize pool of USD 400,000.

The Liga Brasileira de Free Fire (LBFF) is the main Free Fire esports event in Brazil. Comprising 3 divisions, Series A, B, and C, it is played in two stages a year, with the elite qualifying for the Free Fire World Series.

Collaborations 
Collaboration with other popular franchises is a major marketing strategy used to promote the game. Since its launch, Free Fire collaborated with popular video games, celebrities, TV shows and films. Free Fire has two types of collaborations which are global and regional. Unlike global collaborations, regional collaborations are only available to players from specific regions. In 2022 Free Fire collaborated with singer Justin Bieber and debuted his song "Beautiful Love" in Free Fire.

Controversies
In January 2022, PUBG developer Krafton filed a lawsuit against Garena and its parent company Sea for copyright infringement. The lawsuit accused Garena of copying in-game items, game mechanics and overall look and feel of PUBG: Battlegrounds and PUBG Mobile in their games Free Fire and Free Fire Max. According to Krafton, "Free Fire and Free Fire Max extensively copy numerous aspects of Battlegrounds, both individually and in combination, including Battlegrounds' copyrighted unique game opening 'air drop' feature, the game structure and play, the combination and selection of weapons, armor, and unique objects, locations, and the overall choice of color schemes, materials, and textures."

On February 14, 2022, the Indians Ministry of Electronics and Information Technology banned Garena Free Fire along with 53 other apps which posed a threat to India's privacy and security under Section 69A of the Information Technology Act, Constitution of India.

References

External links 
 Official website

2017 video games
Battle royale games
Android (operating system) games
IOS games
Multiplayer video games
Third-person shooters
Video games set on islands
Video games developed in Vietnam
Internet censorship in India
Garena games